The following lists events that happened during 1984 in Australia.

Incumbents

Monarch – Elizabeth II
Governor-General – Sir Ninian Stephen
Prime Minister –  Bob Hawke
Deputy Prime Minister – Lionel Bowen
Opposition Leader – Andrew Peacock
Chief Justice – Sir Harry Gibbs

State and Territory Leaders
Premier of New South Wales – Neville Wran
Opposition Leader – Nick Greiner
Premier of Queensland – (Sir) Joh Bjelke-Petersen
Opposition Leader – Keith Wright (until 29 August), then Nev Warburton
Premier of South Australia – John Bannon
Opposition Leader – John Olsen
Premier of Tasmania – Robin Gray
Opposition Leader – Ken Wriedt
Premier of Victoria – John Cain Jr.
Opposition Leader – Jeff Kennett
Premier of Western Australia – Brian Burke
Opposition Leader – Ray O'Connor (until 15 February), then Bill Hassell
Chief Minister of the Northern Territory – Paul Everingham (until 15 October), then Ian Tuxworth
Opposition Leader – Bob Collins
Chief Minister of Norfolk Island – David Buffett

Governors and Administrators
Governor of New South Wales – Sir James Rowland
Governor of Queensland – Sir James Ramsay
Governor of South Australia – Sir Donald Dunstan
Governor of Tasmania – Sir James Plimsoll 
Governor of Victoria – Sir Brian Murray
Governor of Western Australia – Gordon Reid (from 2 July)
Administrator of Norfolk Island – Raymond Trebilco
Administrator of the Northern Territory – Eric Johnston

Events

January
17 January – Ian Sinclair is elected leader of the National Party of Australia following Doug Anthony's retirement.
26 January – Aboriginal leader Lowitja (Lois) O'Donoghue becomes Australian of the Year.
27 to 30 January – The final Narara Music Festival on the Central Coast of New South Wales features INXS, Simple Minds, The Pretenders, Talking Heads, Eurythmics and Def Leppard.

February
1 February – Medicare comes into effect in Australia.
2 February – Melbourne newspaper The Age publishes phone taps incriminating an unknown judge.
14 February – Elton John marries Renate Blauel in Sydney.

March
6 March – 
A bomb blast wrecks the home of Judge Richard Gee in the Sydney suburb of Belrose.
High Court Judge, Justice Lionel Murphy is named in Parliament as the judge referred to in The Age tapes published on 2 February.
24 March – Wran Government re-elected in NSW for a 4th term.
26 March – The $100 note is introduced.

April
April – A 915g jar of Vegemite is the first product in Australia to be electronically scanned at a checkout.
19 April – Advance Australia Fair is proclaimed as Australia's national anthem, and green and gold as the national colours.

May
14 May – The one dollar coin is introduced in Australia.
18 May – In New South Wales gay sex between consenting adult males is decriminalised.

July
4 July – Pearl, wife of Justice Ray Watson killed when their home is bombed. It is believed Judge Watson was the target.
16 July – Letters Patent issued for the Royal Commission into British Nuclear Tests in Australia
18 July – National Crime Authority is established.

August
August – Brenda Hodge becomes the last person to be sentenced to death by Western Australia, and in the country as a whole, before the complete abolition of capital punishment. Her sentence is later commuted to life imprisonment.
1 August – Australian banks are deregulated.
7 August – Margaret, 35, and Seana Tapp, 9 are attacked and murdered by an unknown man in their suburban Melbourne home. Seana is also sexually assaulted.
21 August – The Federal budget is televised for the first time.

September
2 September – 7 people shot dead and 12 wounded in a bikie shootout between rival bikie gangs the Bandidos and Comancheros in the Sydney suburb of Milperra.
5 September – Western Australia becomes the last Australian state to abolish capital punishment for ordinary crimes (i.e. murder). New South Wales maintained it as a punishment for treason and piracy with violence until 1985†, when capital punishment was finally abolished in Australia.

October
1 October – National Film and Sound Archive (Screensound Australia) opens in Canberra.

November
6 November – In a crime that shocks the city, Melbourne schoolgirl Kylie Maybury is kidnapped, raped and murdered after being sent on an errand to buy a bag of sugar.
26 November – 
Former NSW Corrective Services Minister Rex Jackson appears in Court on conspiracy charges for the early release of prisoners.
A good performance by Andrew Peacock in the leaders' televised debate boosts his poll ratings.

December
2 December – Hawke Government re-elected with a reduced majority.
7 December – Andrew Peacock and John Howard retain their respective positions in the Opposition.

Arts and literature
 Tim Winton's novel Shallows wins the Miles Franklin Award

Film

 Annie's Coming Out
 Razorback

Television
30 January – Perfect Match is launched in the 5:30 pm timeslot, bringing in record ratings for that timeslot & ensuring Ten's Eyewitness News won the 6–7 p.m. timeslot.
3 February – Australia's first nationally televised telethon screens on Network Ten. It is a 26-hour effort to raise money for Australia's Olympic athletes.
11 February – The Nine Network's Hey Hey It's Saturday moves from Saturday mornings to the 9:30 pm timeslot and renamed Hey Hey It's Saturday Night.
26 July – French-American-Canadian animated television series Inspector Gadget begins on ABC.
Christopher Skase purchases TVQ-0.
Network Ten televises the 1984 Summer Olympics from Los Angeles. Also, all stations adopt a uniform on-air look for the first time.
The first televised federal election debate takes place.

Sport

VFL
29 September – Essendon (14.21.105) defeat Hawthorn (12.9.81) to win the 88th VFL premiership
Brownlow Medal awarded to Peter Moore (Melbourne)

Rugby League
23 September – Minor premiers Canterbury Bulldogs defeat Parramatta Eels 6–4 to win the 77th NSWRL premiership. Western Suburbs Magpies finish in last position, claiming the wooden spoon.

Other
25 March – Robert de Castella is Australia's only competitor at the twelfth IAAF World Cross Country Championships, staged in New York, USA. He finishes in 21st place (34:08.0) in the race over 12,086 metres.
10 June – Andrew Lloyd wins the men's national marathon title, clocking 2:14:36 in Sydney, while Mora Main claims the women's title in 2:46:00.
6 November – Black Knight wins the Melbourne Cup.

Births
 1 January – Michael Witt, rugby league player
 10 January – Trent Cutler, rugby league player
 26 January – Ryan Hoffman, rugby league player
 7 March – Jacob Lillyman, rugby league player
 22 March – Tara Simmons, musician (died 2019)
 30 March – Samantha Stosur, tennis player
 3 April – Allana Slater, gymnast
 13 April – Kris Britt, cricketer
 26 April – Petrina Price, high jumper
 3 May – Jacqui Dunn, artistic gymnast
 4 May – Kiel Brown, field hockey midfielder
 10 May – Alana Boyd, pole vaulter
 15 May 
 Samantha Noble, actress 
 Beau Scott, Australian rugby league player
 31 May – Jason Smith, actor
 3 June – Todd Reid, tennis player (died 2018)
 June 14 – Jay Lyon, actor, musician and model  
 9 July – Alexandra Croak, gymnast & diver
 20 July – James Mackay, actor
 24 July – Patrick Harvey, actor
 30 July – Trudy McIntosh, artistic gymnast
 4 September – Adam Marshall, politician
 20 September – Jason Chatfield, artist, comedian
 3 October – Jarrod Bannister, athlete (d. 2018)
 8 October — Laura Wells, International Plus Sized Model and Environmentalist.
 17 October – Michelle Ang, actress
 30 October – Cameron Ciraldo, rugby league player and coach
 9 November – Delta Goodrem, singer and actress
 13 November – Jamie Soward, rugby league player
 14 November – Courtney Johns, Australian footballer
 25 November – Peter Siddle, cricketer
 28 November – Andrew Bogut, basketball player
 8 December – Tim Paine, cricketer
 12 December 
Sophie Edington, swimmer
Daniel Merrett, Australian footballer
 25 December – Lisa and Jessica Origliasso, singer/songwriters

Deaths
 9 January – Bob Dyer, television host (born in the United States) (b. 1909)
 21 January – Alan Marshall, writer (b. 1902)
 17 May – Nigel Drury, Queensland politician (b. 1911)
 19 June – Sir Phillip Lynch, Victorian politician (b. 1933)
 21 June – Denis Murphy, Queensland politician (b. 1936)
 29 September – Hal Porter, author and playwright (b. 1911)
 6 November – Kylie Maybury, murder victim (b. 1978)
 20 December – Grace Cossington Smith, artist (b. 1892)

See also
 1984 in Australian television
 List of Australian films of 1984

References

 
Australia
Years of the 20th century in Australia